Sarum is a historic home located at Newport, Charles County, Maryland. The oldest extant part of the house was built in 1717 by Joseph Pile on or near the site of his grandfather's 17th century house.  It was a box-framed hall and parlor dwelling, 32 by 18 feet.  A shed was added in 1736; later in the 1800s the ends were extended and new walls of brick were constructed giving the house its present dimensions. Sarum was patented to John Pile in 1662, and remained in the ownership of the Pile family until 1836.  It is one of Maryland's finest small Colonial dwellings.

It was listed on the National Register of Historic Places in 1974.

References

External links

, including photo from 1978, at Maryland Historical Trust

Houses in Charles County, Maryland
Houses on the National Register of Historic Places in Maryland
Houses completed in 1717
Historic American Buildings Survey in Maryland
National Register of Historic Places in Charles County, Maryland
1717 establishments in Maryland